Görres is the name of

 Joseph Görres (1776–1848), German Catholic writer
 Guido Görres (1805–1852), German Catholic historian, publicist and poet
 Ida Friederike Görres (1901–1971), Czech-Austrian writer
 Oscar Görres (born 1986), also known as OzGo, Swedish record producer, songwriter, and musician
 Sascha Görres (born 1980), German footballer

See also
 Görres Society, German learned society

Surnames from given names